The men's 4 × 200 metre freestyle relay event at the 2022 Commonwealth Games was held on 1 August at the Sandwell Aquatics Centre.

Records
Prior to this competition, the existing world, Commonwealth and Games records were as follows:

The following records were established during the competition:

Schedule
The schedule is as follows:

All times are British Summer Time (UTC+1)

Results

Final

References

Men's 4 x 200 metre freestyle relay
Commonwealth Games